Oso Creek is an approximately  tributary of Arroyo Trabuco in southern Orange County in the U.S. state of California. Beginning in the foothills of the Santa Ana Mountains near the city of Mission Viejo, the creek is dammed twice to form Upper Oso Reservoir and Lake Mission Viejo. The creek is channelized and polluted along much of its length.

"Oso", meaning bear in the Spanish language, was likely the name given to the creek by Spanish conquistadors. Up to the 1970s, the Oso Creek watershed was mostly undeveloped and the creek ephemeral. The watershed lies close to two major wilderness areas - Aliso and Wood Canyons Wilderness Park to the southwest and O'Neill Regional Park to the west, on Trabuco Creek - but has no major parks within its boundaries. Interstate 5 parallels the creek for over half of its length.

Course

The original headwaters of Oso Creek were in a small canyon in the south-central part of the Santa Ana Mountains. A dam was built across this canyon, flooding it to create Upper Oso Reservoir, which now forms the headwaters of the creek, fed by three small seasonal streams. After leaving the reservoir, Oso Creek crosses under California State Route 241 and for the next mile (1.6 km) of its course, it flows through a narrow riparian corridor surrounded by residential areas in the city of Mission Viejo. The creek enters an underground culvert, bends east and south, and enters Lake Mission Viejo,  from the mouth.

Downstream of the artificial lake, Oso Creek flows through a golf course, then after flowing through another narrow canyon, receives an unnamed tributary from the left,  from the mouth. It then bends slightly to flow southwest and enters a culvert under Marguerite Parkway, emptying into another golf course,  from the mouth. The creek then crosses under Interstate 5 and flows between the highway and Camino Capistrano through a series of freshwater marshes. The La Paz Channel, its largest tributary, joins here on the right. It passes the Galivan Basin, which functions to capture floodwaters from Oso Creek, on the right bank, and receives from the right a second unnamed tributary,  from the mouth. This tributary actually flows through the Galivan Basin before meeting Oso Creek.

The creek then bends southwest around several shopping centers near the convergence of Interstate 5 and California State Route 73, within the city limits of Laguna Niguel. Near this area, Oso Creek enters a concrete flood control channel with sloping sides,  from the mouth. It then flows through a riprap lined channel before entering a concrete box culvert, which runs south under the state route. Flowing through an agricultural area, the creek bends east to join Trabuco Creek inside San Juan Capistrano.

Watershed

Occupying the west and northwest portions of the San Juan Creek watershed, the  Oso Creek watershed comprises about 18% of the  San Juan Creek watershed. It includes parts of the cities of Mission Viejo, Laguna Niguel, and San Juan Capistrano. Most of the watershed is used for residential, commercial, and agricultural purposes. Oso Creek runs parallel to Trabuco Creek, while Salt Creek is to the southwest, Sulphur Creek to the west, and Aliso Creek to the northwest.

The southernmost portions of the San Joaquin Hills lie to the west and southwest of the Oso Creek watershed, and the Santa Ana Mountains border it to the north and northeast. The drainage divide between Oso Creek and the Aliso Creek watershed is quite pronounced, connecting the San Joaquin Hills to the Santa Ana Mountains in a northeasterly direction.

Pollution and floods
The creek was formerly ephemeral, but significant amounts of urban runoff that flow uncontrolled into the creek have created a perennial flow, known also as a "nuisance flow". A structure exists on Oso Creek that is designed to divert a portion of the flow into the Galivan Basin depending on the specific level of a high inflow.

Erosion problems
The canyon was threatening to swallow large portions of citrus groves.

In early 1993, severe storm erosion damage along Oso Creek threatened sewer lines and a church. On 15 March 2000, 21,000 U.S. gallons (80 m3) overflowed into Oso Creek from a broken sewage pipeline in Mission Viejo.

Streamflow

Recreation

The Oso Creek Trail follows the creek for a notable portion of its length, and is said to be the "backbone" of the trail system of the City of Mission Viejo. The paved trail mostly follows a fire road. The trail, however, does not extend to the creek's mouth, as the creek flows through privately owned farmland to its mouth.

References

External links

Oso Creek Trail Map - City of Mission Viejo
Oso Creek Trail - Google Maps
 Mission Viejo's Oso Creek - Oso Creek Trail - Trails.com

Santa Ana Mountains
Rivers of Orange County, California
San Juan Creek
Mission Viejo, California
Rivers of Southern California